Riccardo Lione (born 13 April 1972 in Rome), is a beach volleyball player from Italy. He and teammate Eugenio Amore represented Italy at the 2008 Summer Olympics in Beijing, China. They were eliminated in the first round after losing all three matches. He made his debut in the Italian Championships on 25 June 1994. He played 53 Italian Championship tournaments, winning eleven times.

External links
 Athlete bio at 2008 Olympics site

1972 births
Living people
Beach volleyball players at the 2008 Summer Olympics
Italian beach volleyball players
Olympic beach volleyball players of Italy